Tuya's Marriage is a 2006 Chinese film directed by Wang Quan'an.

Storyline
The film depicts life in Inner Mongolia, in a region where desertification is making life hard for sheep herders. It tells the story of Tuya and her husband, who agree to divorce in the hope of finding a husband who will be prepared to look after both of them and their children.

Awards
The film won the Golden Bear at the 2007 Berlin Film Festival also won the 8th Chinese Film Media Awards for Best Film and Best Actress from Southern Metropolis Daily.

Critical reception
The film received generally positive reviews from Western critics. The review aggregator Rotten Tomatoes reported that 90% of critics gave the film positive reviews, based on 30 reviews. Metacritic reported the film had an average score of 71 out of 100, based on 13 reviews.

References

External links

Tuya's Marriage at the 2007 Berlin International Film Festival

Chinese drama films
2006 films
Golden Bear winners
2006 drama films
2000s Mandarin-language films
Films directed by Wang Quan'an